Heterotheca villosa, called the hairy goldenaster, is a species of flowering plant in the family Asteraceae found in central and western North America.

Description 
The seeds have white bristles at the tip. The species is somewhat difficult to identify, with a number of close relatives and many varieties.

Varieties
Heterotheca villosa var. ballardii (Rydb.) Semple - northern Great Plains in US and Canada
Heterotheca villosa var. depressa (Rydb.) Semple - Wyoming
Heterotheca villosa var. foliosa (Nutt.) V.L.Harms - Rockies, Black Hills, northern Cascades, etc.
Heterotheca villosa var. minor (Hook.) Semple - Rockies, Cascades, Sierra Nevada, etc.
Heterotheca villosa var. nana (A.Gray) Semple - Rockies + other mountains from South Dakota to Arizona
Heterotheca villosa var. pedunculata (Greene) V.L.Harms ex Semple - Arizona, New Mexico, Colorado, Utah
Heterotheca villosa var. scabra (Eastw.) Semple - Mexico, southwestern USA
Heterotheca villosa  var. sierrablancensis  Semple - New Mexico
Heterotheca villosa var. villosa - northern Great Plains, Columbia Plateau, etc.

Distribution and habitat 
The species is widespread across central and western North America, from Ontario west to British Columbia and south as far as Illinois, Kansas, Nuevo León, Guanajuato, and northern Baja California. It grows on plains, rocky slopes and cliffs, at low elevations and in coniferous forests.

References

villosa
Flora of the Great Plains (North America)
Plants described in 1813